Mehdi Karbalaei (born 8 March 1993) is an Iranian football defender.

References

Living people
1993 births
Iranian footballers
Esteghlal F.C. players
Gostaresh Foulad F.C. players
Association football defenders